The LRTA 1200 class is the third-generation class of high-floor light rail vehicles (LRV) of the Light Rail Transit Authority (LRTA) in Manila, Philippines, which began operation in December 2006.

Purchase 
Package A of the LRT Line 1 Capacity Expansion Project Phase 2 included the procurement of 48 light rail vehicles (LRV), configurable to 12 four-car sets. In 2005, the joint venture of Sumitomo Corporation and Itochu received the order of 48 LRVs and signed a construction contract with Kinki Sharyo and Nippon Sharyo to manufacture and supply the vehicles. The capacity expansion project was funded by Japan's official development assistance.

Design
The LRV design is a 6-axle rigid body consisting of two articulated cars.

Car body
The train car body is made of beadless lightweight stainless steel, with composite materials on the indoor panels and aluminum on the inner bone to reduce weight. 1200 class LRVs have 4 electronic sliding doors on both sides.

In total, there are eight air-conditioning units in a four-car train set.

During the production of the 1200 class trains, a mock-up model was constructed. In December 2005, officials from the Light Rail Transit Authority and LRT-1 Capacity Expansion Project Phase 2 consultant Manila Tren Consortium inspected the mock-up model at the Kinki Sharyo factory in Osaka, Japan. It was then displayed at the LRT Line 1 Baclaran Depot in Pasay City in March 2006.

Interior 
The interior is color-toned based on light and dark two-color green in the seats to complement the landscape of Manila. Seats are made of fiber reinforced plastic and has an aluminum bracket type cantilever longitudinal seat for reducing weight. Seating and grip sticks are designed to have ergonomic dimensions, aside from equipment arrangement inside the cab. A wheelchair-compatible space is provided beside the gangway of the intermediate car, alongside an equipped fire extinguisher.

Mechanical 
The bogies are of inside-frame type, similar to the 1000 class. Each LRV has three bogies consisting of two motorized bogies at the ends of the LRV and one trailer bogie under the articulation. The primary suspension is a chevron rubber spring, while the secondary suspension is an air suspension, similar to the 1100 class.

Semi-permanent couplers are present in the ends of each light rail vehicle except the driving cab section of the MC car.

Electrical
The traction control system is IGBT–VVVF that drives the four main motors of the two carriages. The traction equipment is manufactured by Mitsubishi Electric.

The auxiliaries are 440 volt alternating current static inverters and 110 volt direct current batteries.

Brakes 
Knorr-Bremse manufactured the brakes of the 1200 class. The resistors are mounted on the roof for backup regenerative brakes. The VVVF controller has an Electronic Command braking device that uses regenerative and electronically controlled pneumatic brakes. Disc brakes are present on the bogies.

Operations 
The 3rd-generation trains were inaugurated by Japanese Prime Minister Shinzō Abe and President Gloria Macapagal Arroyo on December 9, 2006 as part of the transportation capacity enhancement of the Manila LRT Line 1. The trains raised the line's capacity from 27,000 passengers per hour per direction to 40,000 passengers per hour per direction.

On February 25, 2010, a 1200 class train was used in a test run of the LRT Line 1 North Extension and the MRT Line 3 as part of the MRT-LRT Closing the Loop project that intends to integrate the LRT Line 1 and MRT Line 3 operations, but the integration of operations has not been pursued.

Out of the 12 sets, only 11 sets remain operational, with three light rail vehicles inoperable after a collision as of 2013.

The 1200 class trains operate in a 4-car configuration. However, there are some occurrences of 1200 class trains operating in a 3-car formation.

Special themed trains 
In September 2018, a 3G trainset was decorated with a special "Gabay Guro" decoration to celebrate the National Teachers' Month in the Philippines. The decoration has a library-themed look with images of books. The special themed train was launched on September 6, 2018 and ended a year later.

Incidents 
 On June 24, 2010, two trains (1G and 3G) collided at  station. As a result, LRVs 1248 and 1247 sustained damage. There were plans to restore it, but the involved cars remain idle as of 2022.
 On February 18, 2011, two trains (1G and 3G) collided near Roosevelt Station in Quezon City at the reversing tracks, around a kilometer away to the east. There were no passengers on board when the incident happened. An investigation was conducted and was shown that one of the drivers was texting when the incident occurred. This however caused LRV 1236, the 3G unit involved in the incident, to be in idle state and has not yet been restored for service.
 On May 23, 2015, thousands of passengers were stranded after two trains (1G and 3G) collided near the Monumento station. A train driver was hurt after the impact caused his head to slam into the dashboard of the train. The accident, later revealed to be caused by power fluctuation that affected the signalling system, forced passengers to alight from the station until services was restored around 1 pm at the same day.

Notes

References

Sources 
 
 
 

Manila Light Rail Transit System
Rolling stock of the Philippines
Train-related introductions in 2006
750 V DC multiple units
Kinki Sharyo multiple units
Nippon Sharyo multiple units